Hacienda de Pancho Villa, formerly the Hacienda de la Limpia Concepción de Canutillo, in Canutillo, Durango, Mexico.  It was the residence of Pancho Villa in his final years and is now a museum.

See also 
Casa de Pancho Villa

References

Museums in Durango
Villa